Jenny Be Good is a 1920 American silent drama film directed by William Desmond Taylor and starring Mary Miles Minter, based on a novel by Wilbur Finley Fauley and adapted for the screen by Julia Crawford Ivers. It is the last of Minter's films to also feature her older sister Margaret Shelby in a supporting role. As with many of Minter's features, it is believed to be a lost film.

Plot

As described in film magazine reviews, Jenny Riano (Minter), is an orphaned girl and a talented violinist, who is raised by her grandmother Nancy Beedle (Fisher). She falls in love with Royal Renshaw (Belasco), who is the son of the wealthy social climber Sophia Shuttles (Ashton) by her first husband. Mrs. Shuttles hopes to find a socially advantageous match for her son, and so does not approve of his relationship with Jenny. She would much prefer to see Royal wed to Jolanda Van Mater (Shelby), whose mother has the status that Mrs. Shuttles desires.

Despite his mother's wishes, Royal weds Jenny in secret. When his mother finds out, she forces him to take a yachting holiday and, telling Jenny that he has abandoned her, convinces her to annul the marriage. Jenny's grandmother dies, and she travels to the city to become a concert violinist.

When Royal returns, he is unable to find Jenny, and his parents marry him to Jolanda. Jolanda, however, has become a drug fiend, after initially being given dope by local tea room owner Polly Primrose (Wallace) as a cure for a headache. Royal, who cannot forget Jenny, decides to commit Jolanda to a sanatorium. However, when she realises where he is driving her, Jolanda seizes the wheel of Royal's automobile and steers the car over a cliff.

Jolanda is killed in the crash, and Royal's life hangs in the balance. In hospital, he calls out constantly for Jenny, and his parents eventually relent and search for her. Jenny abandons her musical career to rush to Royal's side. With Jenny's care, Royal recovers, and the two are once again wed, openly this time.

The May 15th, 1920 edition of Motion Picture News lists a musical cue sheet for the film.

Cast         
Mary Miles Minter as Jenny Riano
Jay Belasco as Royal Renshaw
Margaret Shelby as Jolanda Van Mater
Fred R. Stanton as Aaron Shuttles
Sylvia Ashton as Sophia Shuttles
J. Edwin Brown as Professor Gene Jiggs
Lillian Rambeau as Mrs. Van Mater
Catherine Wallace as Polly Primrose
Fanny Cossar as Clementina Jiggs
Maggie Fisher as Nancy Beedle
Grace Pike as Mrs. Rossiter-Jones

References

External links

1920 films
1920s English-language films
Silent American drama films
1920 drama films
Films directed by William Desmond Taylor
American silent feature films
American black-and-white films
Lost American films
1920 lost films
Films based on American novels
1920s American films